Summerdale is an unincorporated community located in East Pennsboro Township, Cumberland County, Pennsylvania, United States. As of 2000, the community had an estimated population of 479. Central Pennsylvania College and the Capital Area Intermediate Unit are located in Summerdale. It is part of the Harrisburg–Carlisle Metropolitan Statistical Area.

Geography 
Summerdale is located at 40°18'41" North, 76°55'54" West, on the west side of U.S. Route 11/15 and the south side of Interstate 81. These two highways interchange just north of Summerdale.

Summerdale was founded in 1909. As people from Harrisburg came over the river during the summers, a dance hall was erected to support their need to party, thus, starting the town of Summerdale. In 2009, Summerdale held a Centennial Celebration. There was a parade, games, and a year-long celebration dedicated to the small town of Summerdale.

References

Harrisburg–Carlisle metropolitan statistical area
Unincorporated communities in Cumberland County, Pennsylvania
Unincorporated communities in Pennsylvania